MDR Aktuell is a German public radio station owned and operated by Mitteldeutscher Rundfunk (MDR).  The station broadcasts news and current affairs 24 hours a day.  At night, it produces ARD Infonacht which is rebroadcast by several other regional all-news stations.  The station was originally called MDR Info.  The name was changed in 2016 to bring it in line with MDR's television news branding.

References

Mitteldeutscher Rundfunk
Radio stations in Germany
Radio stations established in 1992
1992 establishments in Germany
Mass media in Halle (Saale)